Panić is a surname found in Serbia, Bosnia and Croatia. Notable people include:

Branko Panić (born 1977), Croatian football player
Milan Panić (born 1929), American and Serbian multimillionaire, Prime Minister of the Federal Republic of Yugoslavia from 1992-1993
Života Panić (1933–2003), Colonel General of Yugoslav People's Army
Željko Panić (born 1976), Bosnian Serb swimmer 
Romana Panić (born 1975), a Serbian singer

See also
Panich, Americanized form in Thailand and in Serbian diaspora

Serbian surnames